Sage Watson (born 20 June 1994) is a Canadian athlete specializing in the 400 metres hurdles.  Competing internationally for Canada, she is the reigning Pan American champion in the 400 m hurdles, having also won Pan American medals in 2015 and 2019 as part of Canada's relay team.

Career

Watson first represented her country at the 2015 World Championships in Beijing, where she reached the semifinals.  In July 2016 she was officially named to Canada's Olympic team, reaching the semifinals in the 400m hurdles and finishing fourth as part of Canada's women's 4x400 metres relay team. 

At the 2017 World Championships, Watson finished sixth.  At the 2019 World Championships in Doha, Watson qualified to the final of the 400m hurdles with a national record time of 54.32, breaking the previous record of Rosey Edeh that had stood since 1996.

Watson competed at her second Olympics in Tokyo in 2021. She qualified to the semi-finals of the 400 m hurdles, but placed fifth there and did not advance to the final.  The Canadian team in the 4x400 m relay finished in fourth place for the second consecutive Olympics, which she remarked afterward "really hurts."

Due to a back injury incurred six weeks before the Tokyo Games, Watson would later announce that she was stepping away from competition to focus on recovery.

International competitions

1Disqualified in the final

Personal bests
Outdoor
200 metres – 23.80 (-0.2 m/s, Tucson 2017)
400 metres – 51.62 (Tucson 2018)
400 metres hurdles – 54.32 (Doha 2019)
Indoor
400 metres – 51.84 (College Station 2018)

References

External links

All-Athletics Sage Watson track profile and results

Sage Watson track profile Eurosport.
Sage Watson UA track profile Arizona Wildcats.
Sage Watson profile Florida State Seminoles track.

1994 births
Living people
Canadian female hurdlers
Canadian female sprinters
Sportspeople from Alberta
Sportspeople from Medicine Hat
World Athletics Championships athletes for Canada
Athletes (track and field) at the 2015 Pan American Games
Athletes (track and field) at the 2019 Pan American Games
Pan American Games gold medalists for Canada
Pan American Games silver medalists for Canada
Pan American Games bronze medalists for Canada
Pan American Games medalists in athletics (track and field)
Pan American Games track and field athletes for Canada
Athletes (track and field) at the 2016 Summer Olympics
Olympic track and field athletes of Canada
Florida State University
Athletes (track and field) at the 2018 Commonwealth Games
University of Arizona alumni
Pan American Games gold medalists in athletics (track and field)
Medalists at the 2015 Pan American Games
Medalists at the 2019 Pan American Games
Commonwealth Games competitors for Canada
Athletes (track and field) at the 2020 Summer Olympics